Hotel Fremantle located on High Street, Fremantle was built in 1899 for W. deLacy Bacon at the height of the Western Australian gold boom. It was designed by the local architecture firm Wilkinson and Smith. The three storey residential hotel contained bedrooms, public bars, billiard room and sitting room. The design incorporated the existing residential structure built for the previous owner William Dalgety Moore which had been constructed in 1885. The building was classified by the National Trust of Australia in 1974 and placed on the Register of National Estate in 1980. 

During World War II the hotel was used as a hospital with operating theatres. In 2002 the building was purchased to become part the Notre Dame University.

References

Cliff Street, Fremantle
High Street, Fremantle
Fremantle
Hotels in Fremantle
1899 establishments in Australia
State Register of Heritage Places in the City of Fremantle